Kutaisi Museum of Sport is a museum in Kutaisi, Georgia.

References 

Museums in Georgia (country)
Sport in Kutaisi
Buildings and structures in Kutaisi
Sports museums
Tourist attractions in Imereti